The 2004 Road America 500 was the seventh race for the 2004 American Le Mans Series season.  It took place on August 22, 2004.

Official results

Class winners in bold.  Cars failing to complete 70% of winner's distance marked as Not Classified (NC).

† - #30 was disqualified for receiving outside assistance on the race course.

Statistics
 Pole Position - #16 Dyson Racing - 1:51.893
 Fastest Lap - #38 ADT Champion Racing - 1:54.050
 Distance - 
 Average Speed -

External links
 

Road America
Road America 500
Road America 500
Road America 500